John Douglas Anthony,  (31 December 192920 December 2020) was an Australian politician. He served as leader of the National Party of Australia from 1971 to 1984 and was the second and longest-serving Deputy Prime Minister, holding the position under John Gorton (1971), William McMahon (1971–1972) and Malcolm Fraser (1975–1983).

Anthony was born in Murwillumbah, New South Wales, the son of federal government minister Hubert Lawrence Anthony. He was elected to the House of Representatives at a 1957 by-election, aged 27, following his father's sudden death. He was appointed to the ministry in 1964 and in Coalition governments over the following 20 years held the portfolios of Minister for the Interior (1964–1967), Primary Industry (1967–1971), Trade and Industry (1971–1972), Overseas Trade (1975–1977), National Resources (1975–1977), and Trade and Resources (1977–1983). Anthony was elected deputy leader of the Country Party in 1964 and succeeded John McEwen as party leader and deputy prime minister in 1971. He retired from politics at the 1984 election. His son Larry Anthony became the third generation of his family to enter federal parliament.

Early life
Anthony was born in Murwillumbah in northern New South Wales, on 31 December 1929, the son of Jessie Anthony and Hubert Lawrence ("Larry") Anthony, a well-known Country Party politician. Doug Anthony was educated at Murwillumbah Primary School and Murwillumbah High School, before attending The King's School in Sydney (1943–1946) and then Gatton College in Queensland. After graduating he took up dairy farming near Murwillumbah. In 1957 he married Margot Budd, with whom he had three children: Dougald, Jane and Larry.

Political career

Early career (1957–1964)
In 1957 Larry Anthony Sr., who was Postmaster-General in the Liberal–Country Party coalition government led by Robert Menzies, died suddenly, and Doug Anthony was elected to succeed his father in the ensuing by-election for the Division of Richmond, aged 27. He was appointed Minister for the Interior in 1964 by Menzies in a reshuffle, replacing Senator John Gorton.

Minister for the Interior (1964–1967)
During his tenure in the Interior portfolio, there were several pushes for Canberra to become independent and self-governing in some capacity. The Menzies government had not yet established a clear policy for Canberra's future, and Anthony stated that the city was not yet ready for self-governance. At Narrogin in August 1966, Anthony relayed to several rural communities that drought would probably soon sweep the region, and that he was prepared to take precautions to prevent as many negative effects as possible. He was unable to comment on protests that took place outside the Canberra Hotel on 2 February 1967.

Anthony was one of the leading forces against the 1967 nexus referendum, which was seeking to increase the senate's power in parliament. Senator Vince Gair revived the debate around the introduction of such a law in early 1967. Anthony and the County Party decided it would be “unwise” to increase the power of the upper house.

Towards the end of his term as Minister for the Interior, Anthony supported a federal redistribution with conditions so restrictive that it favoured country seats and would increase Country Party representation. Splits within the Liberal and Country coalition were causing such issues to be raised and considered by parliament. These tensions were also fuelled by the narrow majority with which the Liberal Party was returned to power in the 1963 election; without Country Party support they could not have guaranteed parliamentary supply. In 1967 he became Minister for Primary Industry.

Minister for Primary Industry (1967–1971)

His first speech in this portfolio was made regarding the wheat price in Australia. 1966–67 had yielded a smaller amount than the 1965–66 season, and accordingly the price of wheat had to be raised. Controversially, in May 1968, Anthony initiated a payout of $21 million to offset the devaluation of the British Pound by Prime Minister Harold Wilson; the currencies were not yet independent of each other. Anthony's popularity in the Industry portfolio was damaged when rural production was down $450 million in 1968 and little change had occurred in the return that farmers were getting for production. Anthony worked with Prime Minister John Gorton to try to create as many economically viable options as possible to deal with the “wheat crisis”. Eventually quotas were introduced to limit production.  When China stopped importing Australian wheat in 1971, Anthony advised against communication with the country, saying it could be “politically and commercially dangerous".

Deputy Prime Minister (1971–1972)

By mid-1969, it was thought that John McEwen, leader of the Country Party since 1958, was going to retire sometime in late 1970. The three members of the party considered to have the greatest chance of succeeding McEwen as leader were Anthony, Shipping Minister Ian Sinclair and Interior Minister Peter Nixon. When McEwen retired in 1971, Anthony was chosen as his successor, taking McEwen's old posts of Minister for Trade and Industry and Deputy Prime Minister in the government of John Gorton, portfolios he retained under William McMahon. Anthony was made a Privy Councillor by Queen Elizabeth II on 23 June 1971.

When McMahon became Prime Minister in March 1971, only a month after Anthony had taken the Deputy Prime Minister position, Anthony lost power as McMahon disliked him and the two had a poor working relationship. Anthony opposed the revaluation of the Australian dollar by McMahon in 1971–72. In mid-1972, McMahon stopped talking to Anthony and he was oblivious to many decisions that were occurring outside cabinet. When McMahon announced the 1972 election, he left Anthony in the dark and he was unaware of the date on which it would take place and the campaign techniques the coalition would use. Anthony called the Prime Minister of New Zealand, Jack Marshall, to find out the date, as McMahon had only informed three people of the date before approaching the Governor-General. Anthony lost faith in the government and became complacent about the defeat which became obvious in the lead up to the election in December 1972.

Opposition (1972–1975)
After McMahon's defeat in 1972, Anthony was said to favour a policy of absolute opposition to the Labor government of Gough Whitlam. Despite that, the Country Party voted with the Labor Government on some bills, for example the 1973 expansion of state aid to under-privileged schools. Under Anthony's leadership, the party's name was changed to the National Country Party and it began contesting urban seats in Queensland and Western Australia. There was also a weakening in the party's relationship with primary producer organisations. In 1975, Anthony, along with other senior Opposition members, criticised Whitlam for not giving enough aid to Papua New Guinea.

Deputy Prime Minister (1975–1983)

Anthony had a much better working relationship with Malcolm Fraser than he did with Billy Snedden. At first, Anthony did not support Snedden's or Fraser's decisions to block parliamentary supply from the Labor Party, beginning in October 1975, though he was soon convinced otherwise. The Coalition was confirmed in power at the 1975 election, with the biggest majority government in Australian history. Though from 1975 to 1980 the Liberals won enough seats to form government in their own right, Fraser opted to retain the Coalition with the NCP. Anthony again became Deputy Prime Minister, with the portfolios of Overseas Trade and National Resources (Trade and Resources from 1977). Anthony was noted, while Prime Minister Fraser took annual Christmas holidays, for governing the country as Acting Prime Minister from a caravan in his electorate of Richmond.

In 1976, during his second term as Deputy Prime Minister, Anthony began a strong import and export relationship with Japan, particularly over oil. Anthony supported the mining and export of Australian uranium, and believed it would be an essential part of the future economy. While Acting Prime Minister in July 1976, he was the first user of the Papua New Guinea–Cairns telephone line, speaking to Acting Prime Minister Sir Maori Kiki. While Acting Prime Minister in July 1979, he threatened to shut down an industrial strike in Western Australia, stating the issue had to be resolved. The Labor Party was strongly opposed to this action and called his power as Acting Prime Minister into question. After Fraser lost office in 1983, Anthony remained as party leader (since 1974 named the National Party). The last major move as leader of the National Party that Anthony made was to explain the tensions between the Liberal and National parties in Queensland, who officially opposed each other in the October 1983 election.

Retirement and death
Anthony remained in parliament for less than a year before retiring from politics in 1984. By then, although only 55, he was the Father of the House of Representatives. He returned to his farm near Murwillumbah and generally stayed out of politics. In 1996, Larry Anthony won his father's old seat.

In 1994, Anthony appeared in a documentary series about the Liberal Party in which he revealed that McMahon had refused to tell him beforehand the date of the 1972 election, despite Anthony being the Country Party leader. During 1999, Anthony spoke in support of Australia becoming a republic.

Anthony died at an aged care home in Murwillumbah, on 20 December 2020, at the age of 90, 11 days before his 91st birthday.  Until his death, he was the earliest-elected Country MP still alive, and along with his deputy and successor as National Party leader, Ian Sinclair, he was one of the last two surviving ministers who served in the Menzies Government and the First Holt Ministry.

Honours
In 1981 Anthony was appointed a Companion of Honour (CH). In 1990, he was awarded the New Zealand 1990 Commemoration Medal. In 2003 he was made a Companion of the Order of Australia (AC) for service to the Australian Parliament, for forging the development of bi-lateral trade agreements, and for continued leadership and dedication to the social, educational, health and development needs of rural and regional communities.

See also
 Anthony family
 Doug Anthony All Stars

Explanatory notes

References

1929 births
1975 Australian constitutional crisis
2020 deaths
20th-century Australian politicians
Australian Members of the Order of the Companions of Honour
Australian members of the Privy Council of the United Kingdom
Companions of the Order of Australia
Deputy Prime Ministers of Australia
Fellows of the Australian Academy of Technological Sciences and Engineering
Government ministers of Australia
Leaders of the National Party of Australia
Members of the Australian House of Representatives for Richmond
Members of the Australian House of Representatives
Members of the Cabinet of Australia
National Party of Australia members of the Parliament of Australia
People from the Northern Rivers